Stephen John Finnan (born 24 April 1976) is an Irish former international footballer who played as a right back.

He is the only player to have played in the World Cup, UEFA Champions League, UEFA Cup, Intertoto Cup, all four levels of the English league football and the Football Conference. Among the honours won during his career was the 2005 UEFA Champions League Final for Liverpool. Finnan was known for his attacking role and ability to cross the ball.

He played 52 internationals for the Republic of Ireland from his debut in 2000, scoring twice. He played for them at the 2002 FIFA World Cup.

Club career

Early career
Finnan was born in the Janesboro area of Limerick, and moved to Chelmsford, England, at a young age. He began his career playing in Wimbledon's youth system, but he joined non-League club Welling United in 1993 after being released at the age of 16. Finnan turned professional when he signed with Birmingham City in 1995, who paid a fee of £100,000 to Welling United to acquire his services. He scored his first professional goal against Watford.

Notts County
Finnan made a loan switch to Notts County in March 1996, making his debut in a 2–1 victory over Walsall and scoring his first goal a month later in a 4–2 victory over Bristol Rovers. He appeared in all of Notts' games for the remainder of the season, helping the team finish fourth in the Second Division and qualify for the promotion play-offs. In the first leg of the semi-finals held at the Alexandra Stadium he scored against Crewe Alexandra, with the match ending 2–2. The return leg at home saw Notts win 1–0, winning 3–2 on aggregate. In the play-offs final against Bradford City at Wembley Stadium, Notts County lost 2–0. He returned to Birmingham following the conclusion of the loan deal.

During the following season, 1996–97, Notts County signed Finnan for a fee £300,000 on 30 October 1996. He played his first match as a permanent player for Notts County after being introduced as a substitute against Shrewsbury Town. The season was not a successful one for Finnan as Notts County finished 24th in the table and were relegated to the Third Division.  	

In the 1997–98 season, his first full season at the club, Finnan established himself as a key member of the team and was an ever present, appearing in 51 matches, helping the club win the Third Division title with record points and time. The other notable record Finnan established with Notts County during this season was a streak of 10 consecutive victories; a club record and one which still stands today.

Fulham
After strong showings for Notts County in the 1997–98 season, Fulham manager Kevin Keegan paid £600,000 for his services in November 1998. He made his Fulham debut against Chesterfield on 21 November 1998 and scored his first goal for Fulham against Blackpool on 20 March 1999. While at Fulham, he also became a favourite among the fans. His first season with the club was a success, with Fulham winning the Second Division championship and being promoted to the First Division.  	

Finnan finished ninth with Fulham the following season under new manager Paul Bracewell, despite promising early season form and an unbeaten run lasting over two months. Bracewell was replaced with Jean Tigana in May 2000, and under him in the 2000–01 season, Fulham won the First Division championship, winning promotion to the Premier League, with Finnan appearing in all but one of the league matches.  	      	

In his debut season in the Premier League, he helped Fulham qualify for the UEFA Intertoto Cup, was voted into the 2001–02 Professional Footballers' Association team of the year and was also voted as the Fulham player of the year. Fulham then went on to win the Intertoto Cup, giving Finnan his first taste of European football. Next season saw Jean Tigana replaced by Chris Coleman, Finnan's fourth manager in five seasons. By April 2003 with few games to go, Fulham were close to the relegation zone but picked up 10 points out of a possible 15 to stay in the top-flight, finishing in 14th position.  	

In the summer of 2003 Finnan found himself courted by many of England's top clubs, and eventually Fulham agreed to sell Finnan to Liverpool for a fee of £3.5m.

Liverpool

Finnan made his Liverpool debut against Chelsea on 17 August 2003. His first season was disrupted by injury, but in 2004–05, he established himself as the first-choice right back and a firm fan favourite. The season was a highly successful one for Finnan. He scored his first and only goal for Liverpool against West Bromwich Albion, played in the League Cup final, and was in the starting eleven as Liverpool won the Champions League Final, though a thigh injury meant he was substituted at half time. Finnan's goal against WBA meant that he became only the second player to score in each of the five highest divisions of English football; the first was  Jimmy Willis.

In the 2005–06 season, Liverpool broke their record for number of points in a Premier League season, finishing on 82 points with Finnan being ever present. At the end of the season he picked up another medal with Liverpool, winning the FA Cup.

Finnan played for Liverpool as first choice right back for the 2006–07 season despite heavy competition from newly arrived teammate Álvaro Arbeloa. He started in the 2007 UEFA Champions League Final and was subbed off after 88 minutes, Liverpool went on to lose the game 2–1. In July 2007, Finnan agreed a new two-year contract to remain with Liverpool.

The following season, Liverpool's success continued as they finished third in the League and reached the semi-finals of the Champions League. Finnan took his total appearances for Liverpool past the 200 mark and also made it into the top 100 capped Liverpool players of all time. Finnan featured in 35 games, but lost his starting place, manager Rafa Benítez often preferring Arbeloa to start. In the summer of 2008, after the arrival of fullback Philipp Degen at the club from Borussia Dortmund, Finnan was linked with a move away from Anfield. He was offered by Liverpool as a makeweight in a deal to sign Gareth Barry from Aston Villa; the player accepted the move but the clubs were unable to agree a fee. He made a guest appearance in Jamie Carragher's testimonial match in September 2010.

Espanyol
On transfer deadline day, 1 September 2008, Finnan signed a two-year deal with La Liga club Espanyol for an undisclosed fee. Injuries limited his first team appearances, and rumours of a return to the Premier League in the January 2009 transfer window with Arsenal or Tottenham Hotspur were dismissed by Espanyol's sports director Paco Herrera and by coach Mané, who considered him an important member of the team. By mid-January, Espanyol were "surprised" that a move to Hull City did not proceed, apparently for medical reasons. In July 2009, Espanyol and Finnan agreed to mutually terminate the remainder of his contract.

Portsmouth
Finnan signed a one-year contract with Premier League side Portsmouth on 31 July 2009. He made his debut for the club on 3 October in a 1–0 victory against Wolverhampton Wanderers at Molineux, and played regularly in the second half of the season, but with the club in administration and relegated to the Championship, he was not offered a new deal. His last appearance for the club was the 2010 FA Cup Final against Chelsea.

International career
A Republic of Ireland Under-21 international, Finnan stepped up to the senior side in 2000 against Greece. He cemented his place in the Irish starting XI during the 2002 World Cup qualification matches, supplying the cross for Jason McAteer to score the only goal in a crucial 1–0 home win against the Netherlands in September 2001.

Finnan appeared in all three of Ireland's group E games in the 2002 FIFA World Cup against Cameroon, Germany and Saudi Arabia. Ireland progressed to the second round of the tournament for only the third time in their history where they faced Spain. The match ended 1–1 in extra time and went to penalties. Finnan took a penalty and scored, but Ireland eventually lost 3–2.

Injury disrupted Finnan's participation in the unsuccessful attempt to reach the Euro 2004 finals. He was a regular choice in the 2006 World Cup qualification games but Ireland failed to qualify for the finals.

He was again a regular selection in the 2008 Euro qualification games but Ireland did not qualify for the finals. He scored his second international goal in the group game against Cyprus in a 1–1 draw. He then announced his retirement from international football on 22 January 2008 after making 50 appearances for the Republic of Ireland. Tempted by the prospect of working with the newly appointed Ireland manager Giovanni Trappatoni, Finnan came out of retirement in August 2008 to be included in the squad to face Norway in an international friendly.

Personal life
Finnan was arrested in June 2005 after running over an 81-year-old man from Liverpool, who later died of his injuries. Finnan faced no charges over the man's death, despite travelling more than twice the speed-limit at the time.

In 2015, he was living in London and working in property development.

Career statistics

Club

International

Scores and results list Republic of Ireland's goal tally first, score column indicates score after each Finnan goal.

Honours
Notts County
Football League Third Division: 1997–98

Fulham
Football League Second Division: 1998–99
Football League First Division: 2000–01
UEFA Intertoto Cup: 2002

Liverpool
FA Cup: 2005–06
FA Community Shield: 2006
FIFA Club World Championship runner-up: 2005
Football League Cup runner-up: 2004-05
UEFA Champions League: 2004–05; runner-up 2006-07
UEFA Super Cup: 2005

Individual
Football League Second Division PFA Team of the Year: 1998–99
Football League First Division PFA Team of the Year: 2000–01
FA Premier League PFA Team of the Year: 2001–02
Professional Footballers' Association Team of the Year: 2001–02
Fulham Player of the Year: 2001–02

References

External links

Profile at liverpoolfc.tv
 player profile
 Profile at BBCSport
Reds Star Finnan Arrested
Finnan avoids prosecution
LFChistory.net player profile

1976 births
Living people
Association footballers from County Limerick
Republic of Ireland association footballers
Republic of Ireland international footballers
Republic of Ireland B international footballers
Association football fullbacks
Welling United F.C. players
Birmingham City F.C. players
Notts County F.C. players
Fulham F.C. players
Liverpool F.C. players
RCD Espanyol footballers
Portsmouth F.C. players
Premier League players
English Football League players
La Liga players
2002 FIFA World Cup players
Expatriate footballers in England
Expatriate footballers in Spain
Irish expatriate sportspeople in Spain
Irish expatriate sportspeople in England
UEFA Champions League winning players
FA Cup Final players